Deolali may refer to:

Deolali, a hill station and town in Nashik district, Maharashtra, India
Deolali Pravara, a city in Ahmednagar district, Maharashtra
Deolali Pravara Municipal Council
Deolali, Solapur district, a village in Solapur district, Maharashtra, India
Deolali transit camp
Deolali (Vidhan Sabha constituency)